The Minister for Finance and Economic Planning is the Ghanaian government official responsible for the Ministry of Finance of Ghana. The Minister for Finance since January 2017 has been Ken Ofori-Atta, co-founder and former Chairman of the Databank Group (an investment banking firm) in Ghana. He was appointed by President Akufo-Addo following the Ghanaian general election in December 2016. Kwesi Botchwey stayed in office the longest (1982 to 1995), first under Jerry Rawlings as Secretary for Finance in the PNDC military government and then as Minister for Finance in the constitutionally elected Rawlings government at the beginning of the Fourth Republic and was in charge of the Economic Recovery Programme under the auspices of the World Bank which oversaw major economic reform in Ghana.

List of ministers
The first Ghanaian to head this ministry is Komla Agbeli Gbedemah who assumed this position in 1954 when the Britain allowed Kwame Nkrumah to form a government prior to gaining full independence in 1957. The Ministry has at various times been designated as Ministry of Finance or as it is currently, the Ministry of Finance and Economic Planning.

See also
Ministry of Finance and Economic Planning (Ghana)

Notes
 - Kwesi Botchway has been the longest serving Finance Minister. He served from 1982 to 1993 under the PNDC government and from 1993 to 1995 in the same portfolio under the NDC government under Jerry Rawlings. In all he served a total of 13 years.

References

Politics of Ghana
Finance and Economic Planning